Terinos is a genus of Nymphalid butterflies. They are found from Burma, through South-East Asia, to New Guinea.

Species
Terinos alurgis  Godman & Salvin, 1880
Terinos atlita  (Fabricius, 1787)
Terinos clarissa  Boisduval, 1836
Terinos maddelena  Grose-Smith & Kirby, 1889
Terinos taxiles  Hewitson, 1862
Terinos terpander  Hewitson, 1862
Terinos tethys  Hewitson, 1862
Terinos romeo    Schröder and Treadaway, 1984

References

External links
Images representing Terinos at EOL

 
Vagrantini
Butterflies of Indochina
Nymphalidae genera
Taxa named by Jean Baptiste Boisduval